Gargeh (also Romanized as Gārgeh; also known as Garga and Kārged) is a village in Mollasani Rural District, in the Central District of Bavi County, Khuzestan Province, Iran. At the 2006 census, its population was 176, in 28 families.

References 

Populated places in Bavi County